David Graham Phillips (October 31, 1867 – January 24, 1911) was an American novelist and journalist of the muckraker tradition.

Early life
Phillips was born in Madison, Indiana. After graduating from high school, Phillips entered Asbury College (now DePauw University) and later received a degree from Princeton University in 1887.

Career
After completing his education, Phillips worked as a newspaper reporter in Cincinnati, Ohio, before moving on to New York City where he was employed as a reporter for The Sun from 1890 to 1893, then columnist and editor with the New York World until 1902. In his spare time, he wrote a novel,  The Great God Success, that was published in 1901.  The royalty income enabled him to work as a freelance journalist while continuing to write fiction. Writing articles for various prominent magazines, he began to develop a reputation as a competent investigative journalist. Phillips' novels often commented on social issues of the day and frequently chronicled events based on his real-life journalistic experiences.  He was considered a Progressive and for exposing corruption in the Senate he was labelled a muckraker.

Phillips wrote an article in Cosmopolitan in March 1906, called "The Treason of the Senate," exposing campaign contributors being rewarded by certain members of the U. S. Senate. The story launched a scathing attack on Rhode Island senator Nelson W. Aldrich, and brought Phillips a great deal of national exposure. This and other similar articles helped lead to the passage of the Seventeenth Amendment to the United States Constitution, initiating popular instead of state-legislature election of U. S. senators.

David Graham Phillips is known for producing one of the most important investigations exposing details of the corruption by big businesses of the Senate, in particular, by the Standard Oil Company.  He was among a few other writers during that time that helped prompt President Theodore Roosevelt to use the term “Muckrakers”.

 The article inspired journalist Charles Edward Russell to insist to his boss William Randolph Hearst, who had just recently purchased the Cosmopolitan magazine, that he push his journalists to explore the Senate corruption as well. Philips was offered the position to explore more information about the corruption and bring it into the public’s eye. Philips’ brother Harrison and Gustavus Myers were hired as research assistants for Philips. Hearst commented to his readers about Philips starting a series that would reveal the Senate corruption so much, that most Senators would resign. This held true for some of the Senators, such as New York Senators Chauncey M. Depew and Thomas Collier Platt. Philips exposed Depew as receiving more than $50,000 from several companies. He also helped educate the public on how the senators were selected and that it was held in the hands of a few bosses in a tight circle, helping increase the corruption level. As a result of these articles, only four of the twenty-one senators that Philips wrote about were still in office. Philips also  had some of the greatest success  as a muckraker, because he helped change the U.S. Constitution, with the passage of the 17th Amendment, creating popular election for senators.

His talent for writing was not the only thing that helped him stand out in the newsroom. Philips was known to dress in a white suit with a large chrysanthemum in his lapel.

Death
Phillips' reputation cost him his life in January 1911, when he was shot outside the Princeton Club at Gramercy Park in New York City. The killer was a Harvard-educated musician named Fitzhugh Coyle Goldsborough, a violinist in the Pittsburgh Symphony Orchestra who came from a prominent Maryland family. Goldsborough believed that Phillips's novel The Fashionable Adventures of Joshua Craig had cast literary aspersions on his family. To be more precise, Phillips was shot and killed by a paranoid who levied the false accusation that Phillips had used the paranoid's sister "as a model for the complaisant heroine" of the novel. When confronting Phillips, Goldsborough yelled, "Here you go!" shooting him six times.  After Phillips collapsed, Goldsborough yelled something akin to "And here I go!", shooting himself in the head with the last bullet. Goldsborough died as a result of his injuries. Admitted to Bellevue Hospital, Phillips died a day later.  A 1992 novel by Daniel D. Victor, The Seventh Bullet, imagines a Sherlock Holmes investigation into Phillips's murder.

Following Phillips's death, his sister Carolyn organized his final manuscript for posthumous publication as Susan Lenox: Her Fall and Rise. In 1931, that book would be made into an MGM motion picture of the same name and starring Greta Garbo and Clark Gable.

David Graham Phillips is interred in the Kensico Cemetery in Valhalla, New York.

Novels
 George Helm
 Light-Fingered Gentry
 Old Wives for New
 Susan Lenox: Her Fall and Rise
 The Conflict
 The Cost
 The Deluge
 The Fashionable Adventures of Joshua Craig
 The Grain of Dust
 The Hungry Heart
 The Husband's Story
 The Plum Tree
 The Price She Paid
 The Second Generation. Reissued as Daily Mail sixpenny novel No. 161 in 1912, with illustrations by G. H. Evison. 
 The Social Secretary (1905)
 The Treason of the Senate
 White Magic
 Woman Ventures

Notes

References
 F. T. Cooper, Some American Story-Tellers, (New York, 1911)
 J. C. Underwood, Literature and Insurgency, (New York, 1914)

External links

 
 
David Graham Phillips: bibliography, links, and information

Phillips, David Graham, "The Treason of the Senate: Aldrich, The Head of It All," Cosmopolitan, March 1906.

1867 births
1911 deaths
DePauw University alumni
Princeton University alumni
20th-century American novelists
American male novelists
American investigative journalists
Deaths by firearm in Manhattan
People murdered in New York City
Male murder victims
Murdered American journalists
People from Madison, Indiana
Progressive Era in the United States
Burials at Kensico Cemetery
Novelists from Indiana
20th-century American male writers
20th-century American non-fiction writers
American male non-fiction writers
Murder–suicides in New York City